{{DISPLAYTITLE:E8 manifold}}

In mathematics, the E8 manifold is the unique compact, simply connected topological 4-manifold with intersection form the E8 lattice.

History

The  manifold was discovered by Michael Freedman in 1982.  Rokhlin's theorem shows that it has no smooth structure (as does Donaldson's theorem), and in fact, combined with the work of Andrew Casson on the Casson invariant, this shows that the  manifold is not even triangulable as a simplicial complex.

Construction

Freedman's theorem on fake 4-balls then says we can cap off this homology sphere with a fake 4-ball to obtain the  manifold.

See also

References

 
 

4-manifolds
Geometric topology
Manifold